Maungdaw is a town in Rakhine State, in the western part of Myanmar (Burma). It is the administrative seat of Maungdaw Township and Maungdaw District. Bordering Bangladesh, Maungdaw is home to one of 2 official border trade posts with Bangladesh.

The two towns are separated by the May Yu Mountains and are connected by two tunnels built in 1918. The district around Maungdaw is home to a large Rohingya population.

Demographics
In 2008, the population was nearly 400,000 people. The majority of the populace, about 80%, are Rohingya people, who are considered by Myanmar government as stateless Bengali people. The Burmese government does not accept Rohingya on its list of ethnic groups of Myanmar, and thus does not recognize their claim on Burmese citizenship. The remainder of the populace consists of a wide range of ethnic groups, including Rakhine, Bamar, Daingnet, and Mro.

Education
As of 2011, there are eight high schools, 10 middle schools, 16 post-primary schools and 125 primary schools.

Economy
The official border trade post with Bangladeshi town of Teknaf opened on 5 September 1995.

References

External links
20° 49' 0" North, 92° 22' 0" East Satellite map at Maplandia.com

Township capitals of Myanmar
Populated places in Rakhine State
Bangladesh–Myanmar border crossings